Alexander Yakovlevich Gomelsky (18 January 1928 – 16 August 2005) was a Russian professional basketball player and coach. The Father of Soviet and Russian basketball, he was inducted into the Naismith Memorial Basketball Hall of Fame in 1995 and the FIBA Hall of Fame in 2007.

Alexander Gomelsky was awarded the Olympic Order by the International Olympic Committee in 1998. In 2008, he was named one of the 50 Greatest EuroLeague Contributors.

Club coaching career
Gomelsky began his coaching career in 1949, in Leningrad, with the women's team of LGS Spartak. In 1953, he became the coach of Rīgas ASK, leading the team to three Soviet Union League titles (1955, 1957, 1958), and three consecutive European Champions Cups (EuroLeague), from 1958 to 1960.

In 1969, he was appointed the head coach of CSKA Moscow, leading the club to 10 Soviet Union national league championships (1970–1974, 1976–1980), 2 Soviet Union Cups (1972, 1973), and one European Champions Cup (EuroLeague) title in 1971. He also led the club to two more European Champions Cup (EuroLeague) finals, in 1970, and 1973.

He also coached in Spain and France shortly before the dissolution of the USSR.

National team coaching career
Gomelsky was the long-time head coach of the senior Soviet Union national team, leading them to 6 EuroBasket titles (1963, 1965, 1967, 1969, 1979, and 1981), 2 FIBA World Cup titles (1967, and 1982), and the Summer Olympic Games gold medal in 1988.

He was originally the Soviet national team head coach in 1972, and was expected to coach the team at the 1972 Summer Olympic games, but the KGB confiscated his passport, fearing that, since Gomelsky was Jewish, he would defect to Israel. 

The Soviet team, with Vladimir Kondrashin as their coach, won their first Olympic gold medal that year, after a controversial game against the United States.

Awards
For merits in the development of sports and basketball was awarded:

Honored Coach of the USSR: 1956
Master of Sports of the USSR International Class: 1965 
4× Soviet Union Coach of the Year: 1967, 1977, 1982, 1988
Honored Coach of the Lithuanian SSR: 1982
Order of the Red Banner of Labour: 1982
Order of the Red Star
Order of Friendship of Peoples
2 Orders of the Badge of Honour
Honored Worker of Physical Culture of Russia: 1993
Silver Olympic Order: 1998
Order of Merit (Ukraine): 2003

Career achievements

Club competitions 

 EuroLeague: 4 (Rīgas ASK: 1958, 1959, 1960 & CSKA Moscow: 1971)
 Soviet League: 13 (Rīgas ASK: 1955, 1957, 1958 & CSKA Moscow: 1970–1974, 1976–1980)
 Soviet Cup: 2 (CSKA Moscow: 1972, 1973)

National team competitions

 1963 FIBA World Championship: 
 EuroBasket 1963: 
 1964 Summer Olympics: 
 EuroBasket 1965: 
 1967 FIBA World Championship: 
 EuroBasket 1967: 
 1968 Summer Olympics: 
 EuroBasket 1969: 
 1970 FIBA World Championship: 
 EuroBasket 1977: 
 1978 FIBA World Championship: 
 EuroBasket 1979: 
 1980 Summer Olympics: 
 EuroBasket 1981: 
 1982 FIBA World Championship: 
 EuroBasket 1983: 
 EuroBasket 1987: 
 1988 Summer Olympics:

Post coaching career

In his later years, Gomelsky was the president of the Russian Basketball Federation and CSKA Moscow. In 1995, he was inducted into the Naismith Memorial Basketball Hall of Fame. In 2007, he was enshrined into the FIBA Hall of Fame. In 2008, he was named one of the 50 Greatest EuroLeague Contributors.

The EuroLeague's annual Alexander Gomelsky EuroLeague Coach of the Year award is named after him, and so is Alexander Gomelsky Universal Sports Hall CSKA.

Every year the Gomelsky Cup is organized by CSKA in honor of its legendary coach.

Personal life
Gomelsky's younger brother, Evgeny, is also a well-known basketball coach, and his son, Vladimir, also worked as a basketball player and coach. His son Gomelsky [Alexandre] ran a sports association school in his father name, leading to several female Olympic basketball players. He was survived by his four sons and four grandchildren. His wife Tatiana, also a basketball player and coach, died from cancer.

See also
 FIBA Basketball World Cup winning head coaches
 List of select Jewish coaches
 List of FIBA EuroBasket winning coaches
 List of EuroLeague-winning head coaches

Bibliography

References

External links

 Alexander Gomelsky at acb.com 
 Alexander Gomelsky at halloffame.fiba.com
 Alexander Gomelsky at hoophall.com

1928 births
2005 deaths
ASK Riga coaches
Communist Party of the Soviet Union members
Merited Coaches of the Soviet Union
Recipients of the Order of Friendship of Peoples
Recipients of the Order of Merit (Ukraine), 3rd class
Recipients of the Order of the Red Banner of Labour
Recipients of the Order of the Red Star
ASK Riga players
EuroLeague-winning coaches
FIBA EuroBasket-winning coaches
FIBA Hall of Fame inductees
International Jewish Sports Hall of Fame inductees
Jewish men's basketball players
Limoges CSP coaches
Naismith Memorial Basketball Hall of Fame inductees
PBC CSKA Moscow coaches
Point guards
Russian basketball coaches
Russian men's basketball players
Russian Jews
Shooting guards
Soviet basketball coaches
Soviet men's basketball players
Soviet Jews
Basketball players from Saint Petersburg
Soviet expatriate basketball people in Spain
Soviet expatriate basketball people in France
Deaths from cancer in Russia
Deaths from leukemia
Burials at Vagankovo Cemetery
Soviet expatriate basketball people
Olympic gold medalists for the Soviet Union
Medalists at the 1988 Summer Olympics
Olympic medalists in basketball
Medalists at the 1980 Summer Olympics
Medalists at the 1964 Summer Olympics
Medalists at the 1968 Summer Olympics
Coaches at the 1980 Summer Olympics
Olympic silver medalists for the Soviet Union
Olympic bronze medalists for the Soviet Union
Coaches at the 1988 Summer Olympics